Gadia is a Gram panchayat in Barabanki district in the Indian state of Uttar Pradesh.

Geography 

History 
Gadia was one of the many talukas in the great Mughal and British raj- era princely state of Oudh (Awadh).

Nawab of Awadh era
Salar Ahmad's Shaikh family of Juggaur, fourth in descent from Qazi Kidwa, a son of the Seldjuk Sultans of Rum, acquired the Gadia taluqa in 1843.

References 

Cities and towns in Barabanki district